Ungurkuy is a rural locality (a selo) in Kyakhtinsky District, Republic of Buryatia, Russia. The population was 444 as of 2010. There are 7 streets.

Geography 
Ungurkuy is located 69 km southeast of Kyakhta (the district's administrative centre) by road. Ubur-Kiret is the nearest rural locality.

References 

Rural localities in Kyakhtinsky District